Yeniköy, Kuşadası is a village in the District of Kuşadası, Aydın Province, Turkey. In 2010, it had a population of 696.

References

Villages in Kuşadası District